Speedway Senior High School is a public, secondary school in Speedway, Indiana (USA). It is part of the School Town of Speedway.

Enrollment
2007-08 School Year: 532 students (preliminary)
2006-07 School Year: 504 students
2005-06 School Year: 487 students
2004-05 School Year: 455 students
2003-04 School Year: 472 students

Demographics
There were a total of 504 students enrolled at Speedway Senior High School during the 2006–2007 school year. The gender makeup of the district was 51.79% female and 48.21% male. The racial makeup of the school was 71.03% White, 18.45% African American, 7.34% Hispanic, 1.79% Multiracial, 1.19% Asian, and 0.20% Native American. 34.33% of the school's students receive free or reduced lunch.

Athletics 
The Sparkplugs have two IHSAA state championships: boys basketball in 2002 and softball in 2018.

Notable alumni
 Joyce DeWitt - actress known for Three's Company

See also
 List of high schools in Indiana
 Indiana Crossroads Conference
 Speedway, Indiana

References

External links
 Homepage

Schools in Marion County, Indiana
Public high schools in Indiana